Eliza Farnham (November 17, 1815 – December 15, 1864) was a 19th-century American novelist, feminist, abolitionist, and activist for prison reform.

Biography
She was born in Rensselaerville, New York. She moved to Illinois in 1835, and there married Thomas J. Farnham in 1836, but returned to New York in 1841. In 1843 she wrote a series of articles for Brother Jonathan refuting John Neal's call for women's suffrage in that same newspaper, though Elizabeth Cady Stanton and Susan B. Anthony wrote in 1887 that "Mrs. Farnham lived long enough to retrace her ground and accept the highest truth." In 1844, through the influence of Horace Greeley and other reformers, she was appointed matron of the women's ward at Sing Sing Prison. She strongly believed in the use of phrenology to treat prisoners.  Farnham was influential in changing the types of reading materials available to women prisoners. The purpose of her choices was not entertainment but improving behavior. She also advocated using music and kindness in the rehabilitation of female prisoners. Farnham retained the office of matron until 1848 when, amid controversy over her choices and beliefs, she resigned in 1848. She then moved to Boston, and was for several months connected with the management of the Institution for the Blind.

In 1849 she travelled to California with her two sons, having inherited property there, and remained there until 1856, when she returned to New York. For the two years following, she devoted herself to the study of medicine, and in 1859 organized a society to assist destitute women in finding homes in the west, taking charge in person of several companies of this class of emigrants. She subsequently returned to California.

She died from consumption in New York City at the age of 49. She was an atheist.

Publications
Life in the Prairie Land, 1846 - An account of life on the Illinois prairie near Pekin between 1836 and 1840.
California, In-doors and Out, 1856 - A chronicle of her experiences and observations on California.
My Early Days, 1859 - An autobiographical novel.
Woman and Her Era, 1864 - "Organic, religious, esthetic, and historical" arguments for woman's inherent superiority.
 The Ideal Attained, 1865 - The heroine molds the hero into a worthy mate.

References

Further reading

Bakken, G., & Farrington, B. (2003). Encyclopedia of Women in the American West, p. 124. Thousand Oaks: Sage.  Link to Google Book Search excerpt
Levy, Joann. Unsettling the West: Eliza Farnham and Georgiana Bruce Kirby in Frontier California. Santa Clara University: California Legacy Series, 2004.  
Stern, Madeleine (1971). Heads and Headlines: The Phrenological Fowlers. University of Oklahoma Press: Norman.

External links

1815 births
1864 deaths
American abolitionists
American feminist writers
19th-century American memoirists
19th-century American novelists
American pioneers
Novelists from New York (state)
Activists from California
Writers from California
Novelists from Illinois
People from Tazewell County, Illinois
Phrenologists
Prison reformers
American women novelists
People from Rensselaerville, New York
American women memoirists
19th-century American women writers
Activists from New York (state)